Marihuana (El monstruo verde) ('Marijuana (The Green Monster)') is a 1936 Mexican film. It stars Sara García.

External links
 

1936 films
1930s Spanish-language films
Mexican black-and-white films
Mexican crime films
1930s crime thriller films
Mexican crime drama films
Mexican thriller drama films
1936 crime drama films
1930s Mexican films